Gorka Santamaría Nos (born 24 March 1995) is a Spanish professional footballer who plays as a forward for CD Badajoz.

Club career
Born in Bilbao, Biscay, Basque Country, Santamaría joined Athletic Bilbao's youth setup in 2005, aged ten. He made his debuts as a senior with the farm team in the 2012–13 campaign, in Tercera División.

On 26 May 2014, after scoring 20 goals for Basconia, Santamaría was promoted to the reserves in Segunda División B. He was also the club's topscorer during the season with 18 goals in 40 appearances, as the B-side returned to Segunda División after a 19-year absence.

Santamaría made his professional debut on 24 August 2015, starting in a 0–1 home loss against Girona FC. He scored his first goal in the second tier on 6 September, netting his team's first in a 3–1 home win against RCD Mallorca.

On 20 July 2016, Santamaría was loaned to Cádiz CF in the second level, for one year. After being rarely used, he terminated his contract with Athletic on 30 August 2017 and immediately joined Recreativo de Huelva, with his former team retaining an option to reacquire him at the end of the season.

On 6 July 2018, Santamaría signed a one-year contract with another reserve team, Sporting de Gijón B also in the third division.

On 3 July 2019, he joined to CD Badajoz.

Personal life
Santamaría has two brothers who are also footballers. His identical twin  is a defender, while their older brother  is also a striker. Both were also groomed at Athletic.

References

External links

1995 births
Living people
Identical twins
Spanish twins
Twin sportspeople
Spanish footballers
Footballers from Bilbao
Association football forwards
Segunda División players
Segunda División B players
Primera Federación players
Tercera División players
CD Basconia footballers
Bilbao Athletic footballers
Cádiz CF players
Recreativo de Huelva players
Sporting de Gijón B players
CD Badajoz players
Athletic Bilbao footballers